European Union Metro Station (Metrostantsiya „Evropeyski sayuz“) is a station on the Sofia Metro in Bulgaria. It opened on 31 August 2012. Bulgaria's PM Boyko Borisov and the President of the European Commission Jose Manuel Barroso inaugurated the new section of the Sofia Metro, which was funded with EU money. Barroso expressed his delight that the metro station was named after the European Union.

History
As the Sofia underground network was planned in the late 1970s, the station, along with the NDK Metro Station, was originally built in the early 1980s, along with the building of the National Palace of Culture. The original project name of the station was "Hemus" (the name of the large hotel next to the station); during the building of Line 2 of the Sofia Metro, it was planned to be called "Sveti Naum" (as it is located at the intersection of the Cherni Vrah and Sv. Naum boulevards). Shortly before the opening of the station, the city council (dominated by the Citizens for European Development of Bulgaria party) controversially voted to change the name to "European Union". As the timing was so close to the opening of Line 2, many of the maps in the trains still retained the name "St. Naum" even after station was opened to the public.

Interchange with other public transport
 City Bus service: 94, 102
 Trolleybus service: 7

Location

The European Union Metro Station is situated nearby the Earth and Man National Museum and City Center Sofia.

Gallery

References

External links

 Sofia Metropolitan
 More info in Bulgarian
 SofiaMetro@UrbanRail
 Sofia Urban Mobility Center
 Sofia Metro station projects
 Sofia Metropolitan

Sofia Metro stations
Railway stations opened in 2012
2012 establishments in Bulgaria